Dalton & Dubarri was an American rock band active in the 1970s, led by Gary Dalton and Kent Dubarri. They mainly played as support acts for artists such as The Beach Boys, Elvin Bishop, The Doobie Brothers, Loggins and Messina, Dave Mason, Boz Scaggs, and Rod Stewart. The group incorporated various aspects of pop, rock, and soul into their music. Recording for Columbia, ABC, and Hilltak, they released four original albums during their career. In 1979, they had a hit with the disco single "I Can Dance All By Myself", which made the Billboard, Cash Box, and Record World charts.

History

Background and formation: 1960s–1974
Dalton & Dubarri was founded by Gary Dalton Stovall and Kent DuBarri Sprague, who also went by the name Butch DuBarri. DuBarri was born and raised in Quincy, Illinois.

During the 1960s, Kent Sprague was the drummer and leader of a Los Angeles-based band, Kent and the Candidates, who backed Brenton Wood. They also recorded several singles for the Double Shot label, including "Trouble", which was released in August 1967, at the same time as Brenton Wood published the song "Gimme Little Sign". Dalton additionally played guitar and sang in the rock band Churchill Downs, in 1967 and 1968.

In the early 1970s, Dalton and DuBarri were in a band called Boones Farm, which released an album in 1972.

Dalton & Dubarri: 1974–1979
Introducing themselves to the music scene, the band's New York debut was at Madison Square Gardens and they played their first Los Angeles show at the Troubadour. 

Dalton & Dubarri's first two albums were the self-titled Dalton & Dubarri (1973) and Good Head (1974), both released on Columbia.
After failing to achieve a commercial breakthrough with either record, they were dropped by the label. They went on to publish Success and Failure for ABC in 1976. This was followed by Choice, released by Hilltak in 1979, which included the hit song "I Can Dance All By Myself". On May 5, 1979, it was a recommended soul song on Billboard's Top Single Picks. It made #79 on the Billboard Hot Soul Singles chart. The track also entered the Record World Singles 101 to 150 Chart at #131 for the week of May 26, 1979, making it to #123 on June 23. It entered the Cash Box Top 100 chart at #94 for the week of June 2, 1979, reaching #73 in its fourth week, on June 23. They had another hit in 1979 with "'Til the Day I Started Lovin' You", which got to #76 on the Billboard R&B chart. This was followed by "Flying Free", also released on Hilltak.

Band members
 Gary Dalton – guitar, vocals
 Kent DuBarri – drums, percussion, vocals
 Patrick Gleason – synthesizer
 Brad Palmer – bass, vocals
 Tony Peluso – piano, clavinet
 Rick Allen – Hammond organ

Discography

References

 
American rock music groups
Columbia Records artists
Hilltak Records artists